Margaret Clement (1539 – 20 May 1612) was an English prioress of St Ursula's convent in Leuven.

Life
Clement was born in England. Her Catholic parents were John Clement who died in 1572 and Margaret Clement. Her mother was the adopted child of Thomas More. Her father taught Greek and Latin and both her parents taught her. In 1549 they went into exile during the reign of Edward VI and in 1551, she and her sister Helen went to school. They were taught in the school attached to the Flemish Augustinian convent in Leuven known as St Ursulas. The school may have been chosen because Elizabeth Woodford was a nun there since 1548. Elizabeth had been a nun in England and had stayed with her father after her English convent was suppressed in 1549.

In 1554 her family moved back to England and whilst they were there Clement informed them that she wanted to become a nun. Her parents supported her request and paid for her to join Syon Abbey, but Clement was set upon St Ursula's. Her parents stayed only six years in England before returning to exile in Mechelen.

Clement went on to lead the Augustine cloister in Leuven known at St Ursula's. She was elected by only one vote and she was unable to take charge as Tridentine required Prioresses to be more than forty years old. The nun would had come second in the ballot was ten years older than her but bishop of Louvain supported her election. This was a Flemish cloister but the house attracted many English women wanting to become nuns. Between 1569 and 1606, 28 women escaping recusancy in Protestant England joined the house and this was considered to be due to having Clement in charge.

Death and legacy
In 1606 Clement retired and the new elected prioress was Flemish. A group of six nuns, unhappy that their candidate, Mary Wiseman, had not been elected, decided to establish an English house. Elizabeth Shirley was chosen as the person who would organise the new house. Clement died in Leuven in 1612.

In 1616 or 1626 Elizabeth Shirley wrote what is now thought to be the first biography of a woman, by a woman in English. She chose to record her life and how she led St Ursula's convent in Leuven.

References

1539 births
1612 deaths
16th-century English nuns
English priors
Nuns of the Spanish Netherlands